Mount Saint Donatus also known as Mount Rogatec, elevation , is a mountain in eastern Slovenia. It is among the easternmost peaks in the Karawanks, which extend to Mount Ivanšćica in Croatia.

Mount Saint Donatus rises steeply from its foothills to a short, sharp ridge of varying elevation. The ridge offers a very good view and is therefore a popular hiking destination, especially for residents of nearby Rogaška Slatina and Rogatec. The older names for the mountain—Mount Rogatec (Rogaška gora) or Rogač—are probably related to the hornlike shape of the mountain; viewed from Rogaška Slatina from the west, it is a sharp, rocky peak. In the geographical sense, the Slovene common noun rog 'horn' also means 'tall rocky prominence'.

References

External links
Mount Saint Donatus at Geopedia

Karawanks
Saint Donatus
Saint Donatus
Saint Donatus